Harold Hampson (8 June 1918 – 24 June 1942) was an English professional footballer who played as an inside forward in the Football League for Southport and Sheffield United.

Personal life
Hampson's brother Jimmy was also a footballer. Hampson became the first Sheffield United footballer to enlist in 1939 at the outbreak of the Second World War and was evacuated from Dunkirk in 1940. Serving as a corporal in the 110th Regiment Royal Armoured Corps (5th Battalion, Border Regiment), he died of septicaemia in a "north-western military hospital" on 24 June 1942 and was buried in Peel (St Paul) Churchyard.

Career statistics

References

1918 births
1942 deaths
Footballers from Salford
Association football inside forwards
English footballers
English Football League players
Everton F.C. players
Southport F.C. players
Sheffield United F.C. players
Royal Armoured Corps soldiers
Border Regiment soldiers
British Army personnel killed in World War II
Deaths from sepsis
Infectious disease deaths in the United Kingdom
Military personnel from Manchester